D205 is a state road in Hrvatsko Zagorje region of Croatia connecting Razvor border crossing to Slovenia and the towns of Kumrovec and Klanjec to the A2 motorway Zabok interchange via D307 state road.

The road, as well as all other state roads in Croatia, is managed and maintained by Hrvatske ceste, state owned company.

Traffic volume 

Traffic is regularly counted and reported by Hrvatske ceste, operator of the road.

Road junctions and populated areas

Sources

State roads in Croatia
Krapina-Zagorje County